This is a list of episodes for the CBS television series House Calls.

Series overview

Episodes

Season 1 (1979–80)

Season 2 (1980–81)

Season 3 (1981–82)

References

External links
 
 

House Calls